Plimsoll may refer to:

 Plimsoll (surname)
 The plimsoll symbol (⦵ or o) that is used as a superscript in the notation of thermodynamics to indicate a specific arbitrarily chosen non-zero reference point ("standard state").
 Plimsoll line or Plimsoll mark on a ship's hull, named after Samuel Plimsoll
 Plimsoll shoe, which is named for the shoe's horizontal lines, which resemble the Plimsoll line

See also
The Plimsouls, an American rock band.